The 1943–44 French Rugby Union Championship was won by Perpignan that beat Bayonne in the final.

The championship was played by 96 team divided in twelve pools of eight, The first two of each pool was admitted to second round. 
In the second round, the 24 teams were divided in four pools of  six, 
The first two of each poll were admitted the quarter of finals.

Context 

The Coupe de France was won by le Toulouse OEC that beat the SBUC in the finals.

Semifinals

Final 

The start of the match was delayed due an air raid alarm.

After this match many players left the Perpignan to play Rugby league.

External links 
 Compte rendu de la finale de 1944 sur lnr.fr

1944
France
Championship